In the 1997–98 season, the Italian football club Inter Milan, managed by Luigi Simoni, won the UEFA Cup and achieved second place in the Serie A league.

Season overview
Massimo Moratti relied on Luigi Simoni as coach and on Ronaldo as star. Further purchases resulted in Diego Simeone, Francesco Moriero and Álvaro Recoba who – in his debut – scored twice, helping Inter beat Brescia in a 2–1 comeback. Compared to the previous seasons, it proved to be better for Inter who mounted their first serious shot at the title since 1989.

However, with a loss at Juventus, the reigning champions won 1–0, holding three points over Inter. Ten days later, Inter conquered – for the third time in the last seven years – the UEFA Cup beating Lazio 3–0. The domestic league ended with Inter in second place, last achieved in 1993.

Players

Squad information

Transfers

Autumn

Winter

Competitions

Serie A

League table

Results by round

Matches

Coppa Italia

Round of 32

Eightfinals

Quarter-finals

UEFA Cup

First round

Second round

Round of 16

Quarter-finals

Semi-finals

Final

Statistics

Players statistics

Goalscorers

References

Sources
  RSSSF - Italy 1997/98

Inter Milan seasons
Inter
UEFA Europa League-winning seasons